Ebon Samurai (Kioshi Keishicho) is a fictional character appearing in American comic books published by Marvel Comics. His first appearance was in Alpha Flight #9 (2005) and was created by Scott Lobdell and Clayton Henry.

Fictional character biography
Once assigned to the Imperial Guard of Japan, the elite branch of the National Police Agency responsible for protecting the Emperor, career police officer Captain Kioshi Keishicho was present years ago during an assassination attempt by the international terrorist organization known as HYDRA. Although the Emperor was not harmed in the attack, Keishicho was killed by the blade of the mutant Silver Samurai (Kenuichio Harada), who was affiliated with Hydra at the time.

Following his funeral rites, Keishicho's soul descended to Yomi, the Shinto nether realm, where he was confronted by Amatsu-Mikaboshi, the god of primordial evil. Sensing Keishicho's unsatiated thirst for vengeance, Mikaboshi offered to allow him to return to the mortal realm to exact revenge upon the man responsible for his death. Unaware of the strings attached to Mikaboshi's deal, Keishicho readily accepted. However, upon his return to the land of the living as a revenant, Keishicho was shocked to discover that he was permanently bonded to a suit of ebony armor modeled after that worn by the Silver Samurai. In addition, the katana sword he now wielded was mystically bonded to the essence of a shinma demon which subconsciously reminded him of the debt owed to Mikaboshi. Struggling to maintain a semblance of humanity and resist the shinma demon's corrupting influence, Keishicho began to investigate the whereabouts of the Silver Samurai, hoping to dispatch him as soon as possible so his soul could finally be at peace. Hearing that his target was affiliated with Big Hero 6, Keishicho infiltrated the team's Tokyo headquarters, only to learn that the Silver Samurai had since parted ways with the team and was presumed deceased. After a brief altercation, Keishicho explained his situation to Big Hero 6 and briefly operated alongside the team as the "Ebon Samurai", believing he had no other purpose to serve now that Silver Samurai was dead. He was among the team members present at the press conference where Big Hero 6 announced their intent to collaborate more closely with the Japanese government.<ref>Civil War: Battle Damage Report #1</ref> As member of Big Hero 6, Ebon Samurai and the rest of the team fell victim to a mind-control device secretly implanted within Baymax, prompting Big Hero 6 to travel to Canada and attack Alpha Flight.

However, upon learning that the Silver Samurai was still alive, Ebon Samurai immediately left the team to continue the pursuit of his murderer. He then wandered the Japanese countryside, struggling to keep Mikaboshi's dark influence in check as he investigated every possible lead to determine the Silver Samurai's location. Upon learning that Silver Samurai had become the bodyguard of the Japanese prime minister, Kiochi abandoned his quest for revenge, realizing that murdering Harada would constitute a betrayal of his country. He later accompanied his Big Hero 6 teammate Sunpyre (Lumina) to the Microverse to help her liberate her native planet of Coronar.

Powers and abilities
Ebon Samurai's primary weapon is his katana, a traditional samurai long sword, which is mystically bonded to a shinma demon whose dark essence engulfs the sword's blade. He can use the sword, so enhanced, to slice through any known substance except adamantium. However, the demon's presence also corrupts Ebon Samurai's soul whenever he wields the katana. His offensive arsenal also includes a shorter wakizashi sword and sharpened, hand-held shuriken blades.  Ebon Samurai's armor is constructed of an unknown metal native to Yomi and has enough articulation in the appropriate areas so as not to impede his movements.

Ebon Samurai is trained in investigatory procedure and bushidō (the samurai code of conduct), having learned both in Japan's National Police Academy. However, since his resurrection as an Earth-bound revenant, Ebon Samurai is prone to sudden outbursts of rage and violence whenever Mikaboshi's influence becomes too strong to repress.

 Reception 
 In 2020, CBR.com'' ranked Ebon Samurai 5th in their "Marvel Comics: Ranking Every Member Of Big Hero 6 From Weakest To Most Powerful" list.

References

External links
 Ebon Samurai at Marvel Wiki
 Ebon Samurai at Marvel Appendix

Characters created by Clayton Henry
Characters created by Scott Lobdell
Comics characters introduced in 2005
Big Hero 6 characters
Marvel Comics martial artists
Marvel Comics superheroes
Fictional bodyguards
Japanese superheroes
Fictional samurai
Fictional swordfighters in comics
Fictional ghosts
Marvel Comics undead characters